The Communist Party of Bohemia and Moravia (KSČM) held a leadership election on 23 October 2021. MEP Kateřina Konečná was elected the new leader.

Background
KSČM received only 8% in 2017 legislative election and was reduced to 15 seats. Party's support in opinion polls was reduced since then and party's members became worried that party might not enter parliament during next legislative election. In October 2019 party's opponents of incumbent leader Vojtěch Filip started to focus on Ústí region Governor Oldřich Bubeníček as a potential candidate for leader. Bubeníček was endorsed by Josef Skála who ran against Filip during previous elections. Bubeníček stated that he doesn't plan to run, as he believes that party should be run by someone younger.

Petr Šimůnek announced his candidacy on 5 October 2019.

Olomouc regional organisation held a Conference on 1 February 2020. It gave nomination to Kateřina Konečná and Vojtěch Filip. On 7 February 2020 Filip stated that he is yet to decide if he runs for another term.

MEP Kateřina Konečná confirmed her Candidacy on 2 March 2020. Election was postponed on 13 March 2020 due to 2020 coronavirus outbreak in the Czech Republic. New date was announced for 28 November 2020. 10 Candidates were running at the time while Zdeněk Ondráček was reported to plan announcing his Candidacy in November 2020.

KSČM suffered heavy losses during 2020 Czech regional elections which led Filip to offer his resignation to the party committee. It will decided on 14 November 2020 if it accepts it. Despite this Filip didn't rule out his candidacy to the position of leader. Filip's reelection was deemed unlikely due to party's poor election results. There were 11 candidates applied to the election including Filip, Konečná, Ondráček or Aulická Jírovcová.

Filip announced on 9 October 2020 that he won't be running for reelection. The party had to delay its congress on 6 November 2020 due to second wave of Covid-19 pandemic. As a result Filip led the party to 2021 Czech legislative election. It received only 3.6% of votes and lost all of its seats in the Chamber of Deputies. MEP Kateřina Konečná reconfirmed her candidacy following party's defeat. Election of the new leader was moved to 23 October 2021. Hana Aulická Jírovcová, Kateřina Konečná, Josef Skála and Jan Zámarský were the only candidates who eventually decided to apply candidacy. Aulická Jírovcová was endorsed by outgoing leader Filip.

Candidates
Hana Aulická Jírovcová
Kateřina Konečná, MEP.
Josef Skála
Jan Zámarský.

Withdrawn
Stanislav Grospič, MP.
Leo Luzar, MP.
Zdeněk Ondráček, MP.
Petr Šimůnek
Martin Říha, Chairman of Brno City committee.
Miloslava Vostrá, MP.

Declined
Oldřich Bubeníček, governor of Ústí region.
Vojtěch Filip, the incumbent leader. He announced on 9 October 2020 that he won't run for another term.

Voting
Voting was held on 23 October 2021. Konečná was elected in first round by large margin. She received 175 votes while her main opponent Skála received 75 votes, Aulická Jírovcová received 63 votes and Zámarský 6.

References

Communist Party of Bohemia and Moravia leadership elections
Communist Party of Bohemia and Moravia leadership election
Communist Party of Bohemia and Moravia leadership election
Indirect elections
Communist Party of Bohemia and Moravia
Communist Party of Bohemia and Moravia leadership election
Communist Party of Bohemia and Moravia leadership election